Super Rugby is the major professional rugby union competition in the Southern Hemisphere.  The competition began as Super 12 in 1996, consisting of 12 teams from Australia, South Africa and New Zealand. An extra Australian and South African team were added in 2005 and the name was changed to Super 14. A fifteenth team joined in 2011 and the competition was rebranded as Super Rugby. The current format consists of three conferences of five teams from each country. Teams play other members of their conference twice (home and away) and four teams from each of the other two conferences once. The top team in each conference and the next best three over all conferences advance to the finals. In all previous formats there were no conferences and each team played every team once, with the top four progressing to the finals. The tournament is organised and governed by SANZAAR (South Africa, New Zealand, Australia and Argentine Rugby). Super Rugby is considered a successor to the Super Six (1992) and Super 10 (1993–1995), although SANZAR did not administer those tournaments.

Champions

By team

By country

Competition structure

1996–2010
Every season, each team played every other team once, in a round-robin. The venues for regular season matches alternated each year, therefore teams would not play one another at the same venue in consecutive seasons unless they met in the play-offs. The tournament used the rugby union bonus points system; teams were awarded four points for a win, two for a draw, and none for a loss. They received bonus points for scoring four or more tries in a match, and for a loss by seven or fewer points.

After each team had completed their regular season matches, the top 4 teams qualified for the semi-finals. Semi-finals were held under a Shaughnessy playoff system; the first-placed team in the table hosted the fourth-placed, and second hosted third. The winner of each semi-final advanced to the final, held at the home ground of whichever team amassed more points in the round-robin table.

2011–2015
In 2011, Melbourne Rebels joined the Super Rugby competition, meaning that Australia, New Zealand and South Africa would each be represented by five teams. The tournament format was also changed. Teams are divided into three conferences; one per country. Each team plays other teams in the same conference home and away, and plays eight further matches against teams from other conferences, for a total of sixteen games. Each team receives two byes throughout a season; from 2014 no points are added to the team's total on the day a bye is allocated. The highest placed team in each conference qualifies for the finals stage, along with three highest scoring teams which were not conference winners. The two highest scoring teams advance straight to the semi-finals, while the 3rd to 6th placed teams play-off to decide which two teams advance to the semis. The format of the semi-finals and final is the same as that previously used in the Super 14. The bonus points system has also been retained, with the single addition that a team receives four points for each bye.

2016–2020
2016 saw the tournament expand to 18 teams with the inclusion of an Argentine team and Japanese team. The South African conference was split in two with the Sunwolves in South African conference 1 and Jaguares in South African conference 2. South African conference 1 teams will play Australian and New Zealand teams in alternative years with South African conference 2 teams. Every team plays 16 games in the regular season with the top 8 teams qualifying for the quarter-finals 1 v 8 etc. with each conference winner being seeded 1-4.

2020–
Due to the COVID-19 pandemic the 2020 Super Rugby season was suspended, and then ultimately cancelled. Regional tournaments were set up to complete the 2020 season, with Super Rugby AU played in Australia, Super Rugby Aotearoa played in New Zealand and Super Rugby Unlocked played in South Africa. Only Super Rugby AU had a final as such for 2020, with a qualifying final and then final. Following the 2020 season, the South African sides withdrew from Super Rugby, while the Jaguares and Sunwolves also left the competition. Therefore, in 2021 only 10 teams competed in Super Rugby, again in regional tournaments with the addition of Super Rugby Trans-Tasman played between both Australian and New Zealand sides. A final was added to the Super Rugby Aotearoa competition in 2021, while a qualifying final and then final was again played in Super Rugby AU. Super Rugby Trans-Tasman will also have a final.

Tournaments

Key

Teams mentioned are those that qualified for the play-off rounds. Results are written so that the score of the team in each row is mentioned first. The highlighted team won that season's Super Rugby final.

Note. For 1996 and 1997, it was the policy of the South African Rugby Union to send the top four teams of the previous year's Currie Cup to the Super 12. In 1998, South Africa set up four (and later five, then six) Super Rugby regions, similar to the policy adopted by the New Zealand Rugby Union. For these areas, please see Super Rugby franchise areas.

Super 12 (1996–2005)

Super 14 (2006–2010)

Super Rugby (2011–)

Six team playoff tournament (2011–2015)

Eight team playoff tournament (2016–)

Regional competitions champions
Due to the COVID-19 pandemic, regionalised tournaments were played for the remainder of the 2020 Super Rugby season and the 2021 Super Rugby season. Those competitions were: Super Rugby AU (Australia), Super Rugby Aotearoa (New Zealand), Super Rugby Unlocked (South Africa) and Super Rugby Trans-Tasman (Australia & New Zealand).

* South Africa withdrew from all Super Rugby competitions at the end of the 2020 Super Rugby season.

References

Super Rugby champions
champions